A capacitive power supply, also called a capacitive dropper, is a type of power supply that uses the capacitive reactance of a capacitor to reduce higher AC mains voltage to a lower DC voltage.

It is a relatively inexpensive method compared to typical solutions using a transformer, however, a relatively large mains-voltage capacitor is required and its capacitance must increase with the output current, which leads to a higher-cost and bulky capacitor. The primary downside of this type of power supply is the lack of galvanic isolation between the input and output, which means the output side is a dangerous shock hazard. For safety reasons, this type of power supply and every circuit connected to it must be double insulated in all places where a person could come into electrical contact with it.

Capacitive power supplies typically have a low power factor.

By the equation of state for capacitance, where , the current is limited to: 1 amp, per farad, per volt-rms, per radian (of phase). Or  amps, per farad, per volt-rms, per hertz.

Structure 
A capacitive power supply usually has a rectifier and filter to generate a direct current from the reduced alternating voltage.

Such a supply comprises a capacitor, C1 whose reactance limits the current flowing through the rectifier bridge D1. A resistor, R1, connected in series with it protects against voltage spikes during switching operations. An electrolytic capacitor, C2, is used to smooth the DC voltage and the peak current (in the range of amps) in switching operations. Above right a voltage regulator can be seen,  formed by the current limiting resistor, R3, and the zener shunt regulator, IC1. If the voltage stability is not too important a Zener diode can be used as a regulator; the two-terminal device would eliminate R4 and R5 used as a resistive voltage divider in the schematic above.

Example 

This way up to 48 white LEDs in series can be powered (for example, 3.1 V/20 mA/20000 mcd).

Analyzing the circuit of the lamp shown in the image on the right, at 50 Hz, the 1.2 μF capacitor has a reactance of 2.653 kΩ. The LEDs are connected in parallel with the 10 μF electrolytic filter capacitor. There are four parallel branches, each having 12 LEDs in series; these branches consume about 20 mA each, or 4 x 20 = 80 mA total. The diodes limit the voltage to about 40 V per branch. Since normally the circuit is connected directly to the mains network without galvanic isolation, a residual-current circuit breaker is needed in any type of protection circuit used for this kind of LED light.

See also 

 Electrical injury
 Resistive dropper
 UL (safety organization)

References

External links 

 Transformerless Power Supplies: Resistive and Capacitive - Microchip
 Transformerless Power Supply Design - Designer Circuits
 MKP Metallized Capacitors - WIMA

Power supplies